Nací Para Cantar (I Was Born to Sing) is a studio album by Lalo Rodríguez released by EMI Latin in 1994. The album, which was produced by Harvey Averne, earned an RIAA platinum record and a 3M Visionary Award.

Track listing

References

1994 albums
Lalo Rodríguez albums